The King's Command (German:Des Königs Befehl) is a 1926 German silent film directed by Kurt Blachy and starring Grete Reinwald, Fritz Alberti and Hans Brausewetter.

Cast
 Georg Burghardt as Frederick the Great
 Grete Reinwald as Baroness Wendel
 Hanni Reinwald as Her Sister
 Hans Brausewetter as Prussian Leutnant
 Hans Stüwe as Prussian Leutnant
 Fritz Alberti
 Eduard von Winterstein
 Leopold von Ledebur
 Karl Platen
 Georg John

References

Bibliography
 Murray, Bruce Arthur. Film and the German Left in the Weimar Republic: From Caligari to Kuhle Wampe. University of Texas Press, 1990.

External links

1926 films
Films of the Weimar Republic
Films directed by Kurt Blachy
German silent feature films
German black-and-white films
Prussian films
Cultural depictions of Frederick the Great
1920s German films